Isak Magnusson (born 16 June 1998) is a Swedish footballer who plays for Östers IF.

References

1998 births
Living people
Swedish footballers
Kalmar FF players
Östers IF players
Allsvenskan players
Superettan players
Association football midfielders